George Walter Carrington Yeates (5 May 1918 – 8 April 1967) was an Australian cricketer. He was a left-handed batsman and leg-break bowler. He played six first-class cricket matches for New South Wales between 1949 and 1950, scoring 299 runs and taking 6 wickets.

References

External links
 

1918 births
Australian cricketers
New South Wales cricketers
Sportsmen from New South Wales
1967 deaths